The following are the national records in athletics in Italy maintained by its national athletics federation, Federazione Italiana di Atletica Leggera (FIDAL).

Outdoor

Key to tables:

+ = en route to a longer distance

h = hand timing

A = affected by altitude

X = annulled due doping violation or to no doping control

Men

Olympic events

Others

Women

Olympic events

Others

Mixed

Indoor

Men

Women

See also
Athletics in Italy
List of Italian records in masters athletics
Women's long jump Italian record progression
Women's high jump Italian record progression
Men's high jump Italian record progression

Notes

References
General
Italian Outdoor Records 6 September 2022 updated
Italian Indoor Records 30 January 2023 updated
Specific

External links
Italian records at FIDAL web site

Italy
Records
Athletics
Athletics